Alberta Provincial Highway No. 49, commonly referred to as Highway 49, is a highway in northwestern Alberta, Canada. It runs east-west from the British Columbia border to Donnelly, and then north-south to Valleyview.

The portion of Highway 49 from Donnelly to the British Columbia is also known as the Spirit River Highway.  It also comprises the westernmost segment of Alberta's portion of the Northern Woods and Water Route. After Donnelly, the Northern Woods and Water Route continues eastward along Highway 2 and then Highway 55. Its southernmost section, between Highway 2 and Highway 43, is designated as a core route of Canada's National Highway System.

Route description 
The highway passes through Bay Tree, the locality of Gordondale, the Town of Spirit River, before intersecting Highway 2 in the Village of Rycroft. The highway continues east, passing by the hamlets of Wanham, Eaglesham, Tangent, and Watino before crossing the Smoky River. The highway then passes by the Village of Girouxville and the Town of Falher before again intersecting Highway 2, approximately 2 km (1 mi) west of the Village of Donnelly.

At the Highway 2 intersection, known locally as the 'Donnelly Corner', Highway 49 turns south and becomes part of a core route of Canada's National Highway System while the Northern Woods and Water Route continues eastward along Highway 2. The highway passes Guy and New Fish Creek before entering Valleyview and terminating at an intersection with Highway 43.

History 
The southern and easternmost sections of Highway 49 have seen a variety of highway designations.

At the same time, its present-day alignment between Donnelly and Valleyview was designated as Highway 34.

In 1990/1991, Highway 34 between Valleyview and Donnelly was renumbered to Highway 43 and Highway 49 between Triangle and Donnelly was renumbered to Highway 2, resulting in Highway 49 terminating at the Donnelly Corner.

Finally, on March 1, 1998, Highway 43 between Valleyview and Donnelly was renumbered to Highway 49 to allow for Highway 43 to travel west from Valleyview to Grande Prairie and the British Columbia border.

Future 
Alberta Transportation is conducting planning studies for upgrades along the Highway 2/49 corridor between Peace River and Valleyview, which includes twinning the portion of Highway 49 south of Donnelly and constructing a bypass around Valleyview.  There is no timeline for construction.

Major intersections

See also

 List of Alberta provincial highways

References

External links

 West Provincial Highway Projects by Alberta Transportation

049
Northern Woods and Water Route